Mekitze Nirdamim (Meḳitse nirdamim,  "Rousers of Those Who Slumber") is a literary society dedicated to the retrieval, preservation, and publication of medieval Hebrew texts. It was first established at Lyck, Prussia in 1861, and is now based out of Jerusalem, Israel.

History 
The Society's first board consisted of prominent scholars and philanthropists such as Rabbi Nathan Marcus Adler, Albert Cohn, S. D. Luzzatto, Moses Montefiore, Michael Sachs, Mattityahu Strashun, and Joseph Zedner.

The organization's focus on realigning Haskalah and tradition among European Jews was met with opposition from some maskilim. By 1864, nonethelessss, the number of subscribers stood at 1,200. Among its early publications were Luzzatto's 1864 edition of Judah Halevi's Diwan, Salomon Buber's edition of the Pesikta de-Rav Kahana (1868), and parts of Isaac Lampronti's rabbinic encyclopedia  (1864–74).

The Society became increasingly inactive during the 1870s. After Silbermann's death in 1882, Mekitze Nirdamim was successfully revived at Berlin in 1885 by Abraham Berliner, alongside Moses Levi Ehrenreich, Joseph Derenbourg, David Günzburg, Solomon Joachim Halberstam, Abraham Harkavy, Marcus Jastrow, David Kaufmann, and Mattityahu Strashun. Amid the rise of Nazism in Germany, the Society was moved to Jerusalem in 1934, under the leadership of then-president Aron Freimann. Agnon served as president of the Society from 1954 to 1970, and was succeeded by Gershom Scholem.

Notable members 

 Rabbi Nathan Marcus Adler
 S. Y. Agnon
 
 Yitzhak Baer
 
 Abraham Berliner
 Albert Cohn
 Joseph Derenbourg
 Moses Levi Ehrenreich
 Shulamit Elizur
  
 Abraham Firkovich
 Ezra Fleischer
 
 Aron Freimann
 Shelomo Dov Goitein
 David Günzburg
 Solomon Joachim Halberstam
 Abraham Harkavy
 Marcus Jastrow
 Zadoc Kahn
 David Kaufmann
 Louis Loewe
 Samuel David Luzzatto
 Sir Moses Montefiore
 Samuel Poznański
 Michael Sachs
 Hayyim Schirmann
 Gershom Scholem
 
 David Simonsen
 Mattityahu Strashun
 Samuel Strashun
 
 Ephraim Urbach
 David Yellin
 Joseph Zedner

References 

Learned societies of Germany
1864 establishments in Prussia
Hebrew manuscripts
Jewish printing and publishing
Publishing companies established in 1864
Research institutes in Israel
Book publishing companies of Israel
Book publishing companies of Germany